Kilworth is a village in County Cork, Ireland.

Kilworth may also refer to:
Kilworth Heights, Ontario, Canada
North Kilworth, Leicestershire, England
location of Kilworth House
South Kilworth, Leicestershire, England

See also
Garry Kilworth, novelist